This is a complete list of New Zealand women Test cricketers. A Test match is an international cricket match between two of the leading cricketing nations. This list contains every woman to have played Test cricket for New Zealand. Their first Test match was against England, in February 1935. Their last Test was in 2004 against England. Since the team was formed, 125 women have represented New Zealand in Test cricket.

Key

List of Test cricketers
Statistics are correct as of New Zealand women's most recent Test match, against England on 21 August 2004.

References 

 
Women
New Zealand Test
Cricket